Squash is a popular sport in Egypt.

As of 2018, Egypt was a squash superpower. It has been producing top players since the 1930s, and it is believed that former president Hosni Mubarak, a keen player himself, gave it a major boost in the 1990s. It has also been said that the current success is the result of an investment in the sport of Egyptian society as a whole.

Professional competitions
Many professional squash competitions take place in Egypt each year.

PSA World Tour
Egyptian events in the PSA World Tour calendar include the El Gouna International (PSA150) and the Alexandria International tournaments.

Top players
As of April 2018, Egypt boasted 5 out of the top 10 male players in the world and 5 out of the top 10 female players in the world. The El Shorbagy brothers had been particularly successful, with Mohamed and Marwan being the world numbers 2 and 6 respectively.

World number ones
Egypt has produced the following world number ones:
 Men:
 Amr Shabana
 Karim Darwish
 Ramy Ashour
 Mohamed El Shorbagy
 Karim Abdel Gawad
  Ali Farag 
 Women:
 Raneem El Weleily
 Nour El Sherbini
 Nouran Gohar

Highest ranked players
As of August 2022, the highest ranked Egyptian squash players were:
 Men:
 Ali Farag (1)
 Mostafa Asal (3)
 Tarek Momen (6)
 Mazen Hesham (8)
 Marwan Elshorbagy (9)
 Women:
 Nouran Gohar (1)
 Nour El Sherbini (2)
 Hania El Hammamy (3)
 Rowan Elaraby (7)
 Salma Hany (9)

National teams
Egypt has national men's and women's teams, that represent the country in international competitions.

Governance
Squash in Egypt is governed by the Egyptian Squash Association.

See also
Sport in Egypt

References

External links
 Egyptian Squash Federation 
 Egyptian Squash Federation